A coconut cup is a variety of standing cup, made and used in Western Europe in the 15th and 16th Centuries, with a revival in Georgian England.

History 
It is probable that the earliest standing cups referred to as hanaps had turned wood (mazer-like) bowls with covers. Later ones have bowls formed of silver or of a coconut or ostrich egg with silver mounts. Cups with coconut bowls (see illustration) mounted in silver or silver-gilt and raised on a stem and foot, or multiple feet, were fashionable rareties in Western Europe in the late 15th century and throughout the 16th century. They were revived for a short period nearly three centuries later.

See also
 Coconut shell cup
 Coco chocolatero
 Drinking horn
 Nautilus shell cup

Notes and references

 CINOA
 Collectors Weekly
 Luc Duerloo and Werner Thomas (eds), Albert & Isabelle, 1598-1621. Catalogue, exhibition catalogue Brussels 1998, numbers 218, 222.
 R. Fritz, "Kokosnootbokalen vervaardigd in de Nederlanden" (Coconut cups crafted in the Low Countries), Antiek 13 (1979): 673-731.

Coconuts
Drinkware
Silver objects